International Biosciences (IBDNA), is a UK-based DNA testing company with offices in Brighton, East Sussex. The company offers a range of DNA tests including the Natera Panorama prenatal test as well as peace of mind relationship tests, ancestry and genetic predisposition testing., International Biosciences operates worldwide and has operations in Ireland, France, Germany, Spain, Italy, Canada and India.

History 

Founded in 2005, the company was the subject of criticism in July 2009 when it launched over-the-counter paternity tests via Pharmacies across the United Kingdom making it the first company to retail DNA kits on the high street. Josephine Quintavalle, of Comment on Reproductive Ethics, said the easy availability of the test raised deep concerns 
The sales initiative was very similar to that successfully employed in the US by Identigene, L.L.C. a subsidiary of Sorenson Genomics, LLC.

References

External links 

 

Medical tests
Companies based in Brighton and Hove